Smim Htaw Buddhaketi was the first king of the Restored Kingdom of Hanthawaddy which overthrew Toungoo Dynasty's rule in Lower Burma. From 1740 to 1747, the ethnic Burman king was a nominal figurehead of the ethnic Mon rebellion. He was selected to be king by the leaders of the Mon insurrection for his royal lineage.

Styled with the Mon title Smim Htaw Buddhaketi ("") the former Buddhist monk found it difficult to adjust himself to the life of king. As an ethnic Burman, he was reluctant to take charge of the government or command of the army, and usually absent from the capital. Much of the governance and fighting was left to his prime minister Binnya Dala, a local Mon nobleman. Forced to abdicate, he left for Chiang Mai, but was later imprisoned by Borommakot and sent to China, where he made his way back to Chiang Mai.

Background
He was reputedly a son of lord of Pagan who fled to east of Pegu after his unsuccessful revolt against King Taninganway in 1714. This would make the Burmese king Mahadhammaraza Dipadi a nephew of his. Smim Htaw Buddhaketi grew up among Shans and Karens of the region, and spoke Mon.

Accession and abdication

He was forced to abdicate his throne in January 1747.

Notes

References

Bibliography
 
 

 
 
 

Toungoo dynasty
Restored Hanthawaddy dynasty
18th-century Burmese monarchs